María Francisca Mardones Sáez (born 24 March 1989), known as Francisca Mardones, is a Chilean footballer who plays as a midfielder for Santiago Morning and the Chile women's national team.

International career
Mardones represented Chile at the 2008 FIFA U-20 Women's World Cup. She made her senior debut during the 2011 Pan American Games.

International goals
Scores and results list Chile's goal tally first

References

External links

1989 births
Living people
Women's association football midfielders
Chilean women's footballers
Footballers from Santiago
Chile women's international footballers
College women's soccer players in the United States
Unión La Calera footballers
Santiago Morning (women) footballers
Chilean expatriate women's footballers
Chilean expatriate sportspeople in the United States
Expatriate women's soccer players in the United States
Footballers at the 2020 Summer Olympics
Olympic footballers of Chile